The Building at 108 Green Street, also known as the KTIB Radio Building, is a historic commercial building located at 108 Green Street in Thibodaux, Louisiana.

Built in c.1900, the structure is a two-story brick commercial building with an Eastlake gallery on two sides. Lower gallery is cast-iron, while upper gallery has wooden columns.

The building was listed on the National Register of Historic Places on March 5, 1986.

It is one of 14 individually NRHP-listed properties in the "Thibodaux Multiple Resource Area", which also includes:
Bank of Lafourche Building
Breaux House

Chanticleer Gift Shop
Citizens Bank of Lafourche
Grand Theatre
Lamartina Building
McCulla House
Peltier House
Percy-Lobdell Building
Riviere Building
Riviere House
Robichaux House
St. Joseph Co-Cathedral and Rectory

See also
 National Register of Historic Places listings in Lafourche Parish, Louisiana

References

Commercial buildings on the National Register of Historic Places in Louisiana
Commercial buildings completed in 1900
Lafourche Parish, Louisiana
National Register of Historic Places in Lafourche Parish, Louisiana